Château de Castillon  is a château in Landes, Nouvelle-Aquitaine, France. It is built in the Louis XIII 18th century style.

Houses completed in the 18th century
Châteaux in Landes (department)
18th-century architecture in France